Mão Morta is a Portuguese avant-garde rock band that started its activities in 1985 in Braga. The group's name means "dead hand", based on a traditional Portuguese nursery rhyme. They are generally considered to be one of the most important bands in the Portuguese rock scene and have since reached a cult status. Since the start of their career, their live concerts became famous for their intensity and dark  mood, due to their signature alternative rock sound and the performance of vocalist Adolfo Luxúria Canibal (a pseudonym, meaning Adolph Cannibal Lust), known for occasional onstage theatrics and his gravelly voice, half-sung, half-spoken singing style. Mão Morta's music is difficult to categorize as they incorporate a variety of genres; from punk rock, metal, to industrial and experimental. Their sound, combined with Adolfo's lyrics, reflects urban violence, a human search for pleasure, freedom and a critique of contemporary consumerist society, often with sarcastic humour.

Members

Current members 

 Adolfo Luxúria Canibal - vocals, songwriter 
 Miguel Pedro - drums, programmer, composer, producer
 António Rafael - keyboards, guitar, composer, producer
 Sapo - guitar
 Vasco Vaz - guitar, composer
 Joana Longobardi - bass

Past members 

 Marta Abreu - bass (2000)
 José Pedro Moura - bass, composer (1990 - 2000)
 Carlos Fortes - guitar, keyboard, bass, composer (1986 - 1994)
 Zé dos Eclipses - guitar, songwriter, composer (1985 - 1991)
 Joaquim Pinto - bass, keyboard, composer (1984 - 1990)
 Paulo Trindade drums - (1987)

Discography

Studio albums

 Mão Morta (1988)
 Corações Felpudos (1990)
 O.D., Rainha do Rock & Crawl (1991)
 Mutantes S.21 (1992)
 Vénus Em Chamas (1994)
 Há Já Muito Tempo Que Nesta Latrina O Ar Se Tornou Irrespirável (1998)
 Primavera de Destroços (2001)
 Nus (2004)
 Pesadelo em Peluche (2010)
 Pelo Meu Relógio São Horas De Matar (2014)
 No Fim Era o Frio (2019)

Live albums

 Müller No Hotel Hessischer Hof (1997)
 Ao Vivo na Aula Magna 8 de Maio 2001 (2001, bonus disc from Primavera de Destroços)
 Carícias Malícias (2003)
 Maldoror (2008)
 Rituais Transfigurados - Mão Morta Vs. Maya Deren (2009)

Singles and promos

 Desmaia, Irmã, Desmaia / Desmaia, Irmã, Desmaia (1990)
 Anjos Marotos / Negra Flor (1993)
 Cães de Crómio (1994)
 Sangue no Asfalto (1995)
 Faixas de Rodagem 5 (1995) - Chabala
 Chabala (1996)
 Em Directo Para a Televisão / Jogos de Guerra (1998)
 É Um Jogo (Radio Edit) (1998)
 Turbulência (1999) - Anjos da Pureza
 Cão da Morte / Chabala (versão longa) (2001)
 Gumes5 (O Rei Mimado) / Gnoma (2004)

Compilations

 Mão Morta Revisitada (1995)

Original soundtracks

 Respirar (Debaixo de Água) (2004) - Oub'lá

Other
 À Sombra de Deus - Braga 1988 (1989) - 1º de Novembro
 Ama Romanta 86-89 (1999) - Oub'lá
 Insurrectos (1990) - Véus Caídos
 Variações - As Canções de António (1994) - Visões - Ficções (Nostradamus) (tribute album to António Variações)
 Os Filhos da Madrugada (1994) - O Avô Cavernoso (tribute album to José Afonso)
 À Sombra de Deus Vol. 2 - Braga (1994) - Rotte - A Morte é um Acto Solitário
 Uma História de Amor (1995) - Cães de Crómio
 Portugales (1995) - Visões - Ficções (Nostradamus)
 Pop Rock Em Português (1997) - Budapeste (Sempre a Rock & Rollar)
 Blitz - Os Melhores de 97 (1998) - Eu Sou o Anjo do Desespero
 Portugal 98 (1998) - Canção da Revolta
 Expresso 25 Anos - Portugal Rock (1998) - Budapeste (Sempre a Rock & Rollar)
 XX Anos XX Bandas (1999) - Mãe (tribute to Xutos & Pontapés)
 Ama Romanta - Sempre! (1999) - Oub'lá
 Ar de Rock - Vinte Anos Depois (2000) - No Domingo Fui Às Antas (tribute album to Rui Veloso)
 Rock Sound Volume 8 (2003) - Escravos do Desejo
 Manifesto (2004) - Estilo and Berlim
 Rock Sound Volume 17 (2004) - Vertigem
 À Sombra de Deus Vol. 3 - Braga (2004) - Sobe, Querida, Desce
 3 Pistas - Antena 3 (2005) - Fado Canibal and Kayatronic (original song by Corpo Diplomático)
 Lisboa@Com.Fusion.Com (2006) - Primavera de Destroços

DVD

 Müller No Hotel Hessischer Hof (2006)
 Maldoror (2008)

References

Books

 Adolfo Luxúria CANIBAL, Estilhaços. Quasi Edições, 2003.
 Vítor JUNQUEIRA, Narradores da Decadência. Quasi Edições, 2004.

Biographies
 Música Portuguesa - Anos 80 (Portuguese)
 Festival Paredes de Coura (Portuguese)

Interviews
 123Som with Adolfo Luxúria Canibal (21.05.2002) (Portuguese)
 JornalismoPortoNet with Adolfo Luxúria Canibal (20.03.2005) (Portuguese)
 Portugal Diário part 1 and part 2 with Adolfo Luxúria Canibal (13.04.2006) (Portuguese)

External links
 Official Mão Morta Website (Portuguese and English version)
 Cobra Discos (Portuguese)

Portuguese rock music groups
Portuguese alternative rock groups
Portuguese post-punk music groups
Musical groups established in 1984
Death rock groups
Noise rock groups